German submarine U-702 was a Type VIIC U-boat built for the Nazi Germany's Kriegsmarine for service during World War II. She was under the command of Kapitänleutnant Wolf-Rüdiger von Rabenau (Crew 30).

Design
German Type VIIC submarines were preceded by the shorter Type VIIB submarines. U-702 had a displacement of  when at the surface and  while submerged. She had two shafts and two  propellers.

U-702 was fitted with five  torpedo tubes (four fitted at the bow and one at the stern), fourteen torpedoes, one  SK C/35 naval gun, 220 rounds, and a  C/30 anti-aircraft gun. The boat had a complement of between forty-four and sixty.

Service
Originally serving with 5th U-Boat Flotilla a training vessel from 3 September 1941 until 28 February 1942, U-702 was transferred to the 7th U-Boat Flotilla for her official war-time service. On 21 March, twenty-one days after her transfer, she set sail from Hamburg on a two-day voyage to the Heligoland island chain to prepare for her first assignment. She left port on the twenty-ninth, and began her patrol of the North Sea. On 31 March 1942, U-702 struck a mine laid by the French submarine  in position

References

Bibliography

External links

U-boats commissioned in 1941
1941 ships
Ships built in Hamburg
U-boats sunk in 1942
World War II submarines of Germany
German Type VIIC submarines
U-boats sunk by mines
Maritime incidents in April 1942